The WFK D.I (series 85) was a fighter aircraft built in Austria-Hungary in the final months of World War I.

Operational history
The KuKLFT placed an order for 48 D.Is. However, only two aircraft were delivered by the time of the Armistice, and the rest were finished in December 1918-January 1919.

Specifications (80.06b)

References

1910s Austro-Hungarian fighter aircraft
Single-engined tractor aircraft
Biplanes
Aircraft first flown in 1918